Chinese Footballer of the Year is an annual association football award organized and presented by Titan Sports. It includes two titles presented to the best Chinese male player and the best female player in the past calendar year respectively. The men and women winners are determined by a poll of journalists representing their media outlets from both China and overseas. Eligible for the award are Chinese players who hold the Chinese passport, whether they play in China or overseas. Wu Lei won the male prize for thrice while Wang Shuang won the female title for four times. They have the most Chinese Footballer of the Year titles in each category.

Winners

Men's Prize

Women's Prize

References

Chinese football trophies and awards
Association football player of the year awards by nationality
Footballers in China
Annual sporting events in China
Association football player non-biographical articles